Song Zhaolin (1928 – 7 June 2011) was a Chinese translator. He was most notable for being one of the main translators into Chinese of the novels of Jane Eyre, A Tale of Two Cities and David Copperfield.

Biography
Song was born in Jinhua, Zhejiang, in 1928. In 1953 he graduated from Zhejiang University, where he majored in English language and literature. He started to publish works in 1950. In 1984 he joined the China Writers Association. He was a member of the Communist Party of China (CPC). On June 7, 2011, he died at the age of 83.

Personal life
Song had three sons.

Translations

References

1928 births
People from Jinhua
2011 deaths
Zhejiang University alumni
English–Chinese translators
20th-century Chinese translators
21st-century Chinese translators